Geoffrey Collins may refer to:

 Geoff Collins (American football) (born 1971), American football coach
 Geoff Collins (1926–2005), Australian rules footballer
 Geoffrey Collins (cricketer, born 1909) (1909–1968), English cricketer
 Geoffrey Collins (cricketer, born 1918) (1918–2008), English cricketer
 Geoffrey Collins (musician), Australian flautist
 Geoffrey Abdy Collins, British solicitor